Qahtaniyah or Kahtaniya may refer to:

Al-Qahtaniyah, Raqqa, a town in Raqqa Governorate in northern Syria
Al-Qahtaniyah, Al-Hasakah, a town in al-Hasakah Governorate in northeastern Syria
Qahtaniyah, Iraq, a town near Mosul in northern Iraq

See also
Qahtanite, a major tribe from Arabia
Al-Qahtani (disambiguation), Arabic surname